14-XS was an Operação Cruzeiro mission conducted by the Brazilian Air Force at the Alcantara Launch Center on December 14, 2021.

Mission
The flight was a test to demonstrate scramjet technology. The device was launched by a Hypersonic Accelerator Vehicle (based on the VSB-30 rocket) and accelerated to Mach 6 to an altitude of 30 kilometers, from where it continued until it reached a suborbital apogee at an altitude of 160 kilometers and 200 kilometers down range from the launch site, impacting at the Atlantic Ocean. The model tested combustion in a hypersonic environment and Mach 6 speed was reached at 50 km. 

Both the Alcântara Launch Center and the Barreira do Inferno Launch Center acted as tracking stations. The vehicle was the first with a scramjet engine built in Brazil and reached up to 5,000 hp. The vehicle was built by Orbital Engenharia.

Both the rocket and the 14-X were built in São José dos Campos. The engine has been under development since 2008, with the goal of enabling the Brazilian industry to develop aerospace experiments.

See also
14-X
Brazilian space program

References

2021 in spaceflight
December 2021 events in Brazil
Suborbital spaceflight
Test spaceflights
Space program of Brazil